Jay Black (born David Blatt; November 1, 1938 – October 22, 2021) was an American singer whose height of fame came in the 1960s when he was the lead singer of the band Jay and the Americans. The band had numerous hits including "Come a Little Bit Closer", "Cara Mia", and "This Magic Moment".

Biography
Black was born in Astoria, Queens and grew up in the Brooklyn neighborhood of Borough Park. In his later career, he was known for touring New York State and Florida, singing, mainly solo, and preceding his singing with a stand-up comedy routine. Jay and his brother spoke Yiddish fluently. In 1966, he recorded a Yiddish song "Where Is My Village" about the Holocaust.
He had 4 children, one of whom is American musician and singer-songwriter Beau Black.

Career 

Jay Black was the second, and more widely known, Jay to lead the band Jay and the Americans, the first being Jay Traynor. Black had previously come from the doo-wop group The Empires, where he had sung lead on their 1962 lone Epic Records single "Time and a Place" b/w "Punch Your Nose" (Epic 5-9527).  He had previously used David Black as his professional name, but changed his first name to suit the band's existing name. He would later bill himself as "Jay Black and the Americans" after the original band had broken up.

In 2006, Black completed bankruptcy proceedings in Manhattan, after he accrued a $500,000 debt in back taxes to the IRS as a result of his gambling addiction. The IRS initially sought to force him to sell the rights to perform as "Jay Black" as well as the trademark for "Jay and the Americans" in order to satisfy his debt to the IRS. Black did, however, win a partial victory in the case, which granted him the right to continue to use the name "Jay Black", but he was required to sell the rights to perform as "Jay and the Americans". The trademark to "Jay and the Americans" was purchased by former members of "Jay and the Americans". He lost the right to perform as "Jay Black and the Americans" and later performed as "Jay Black The Voice". In 2011 Black performed for PBS showcasing his longstanding range at age 72. His final performance was in 2017.

Health issues and death
In a 2014 interview, he implied that he might have been suffering from the early stages of Alzheimer's disease, but that was not officially diagnosed.

Black died from pneumonia in Queens on October 22, 2021. At the time of his death, it was confirmed that he also had dementia.

References

External links 
Jay Black at Wenig-Lamonica Associates
 

1938 births
2021 deaths
20th-century American Jews
20th-century American male singers
20th-century American singers
21st-century American Jews
21st-century American male singers
21st-century American singers
American male pop singers
Deaths from pneumonia in New York City
People with dementia
Jay and the Americans members
Jewish American musicians
Jewish singers
People from Astoria, Queens
People from Borough Park, Brooklyn
Singers from New York City
Yiddish-language singers of the United States